Samereh-ye Olya (also Romanized as Sāmereh-ye ‘Olyā; also known as Samarrah and Sāmereh) is a village in Mahidasht Rural District, Mahidasht District, Kermanshah County, Kermanshah Province, Iran. At the 2006 census, its population was 227, in 56 families.

References 

Populated places in Kermanshah County